North Warwick Historic and Archeological District is a national historic district located in Warwick Township, Chester County, Pennsylvania. It is adjacent to the Hopewell Furnace National Historic Site. The district includes 55 contributing buildings, 39 contributing archaeological sites, 13 contributing structures, and 1 contributing object in a mineral rich, well forested area.  Archaeological remains document prehistoric habitation dating back to 3000 BC.  The contributing buildings include log and fieldstone buildings, many of which date to the 18th and 19th centuries.  They include two well designed Georgian style dwellings dated to 1817 and 1822.  Also located in the district are the Bethesda Church, or Lloyd's Meeting House (1782), Pine Swamp Evangelical Church (1894), and Monocacy Schoolhouse (1884).

It was added to the National Register of Historic Places in 1995.

References

Historic districts on the National Register of Historic Places in Pennsylvania
Georgian architecture in Pennsylvania
Historic districts in Chester County, Pennsylvania
Archaeological sites on the National Register of Historic Places in Pennsylvania
National Register of Historic Places in Chester County, Pennsylvania